This is a list of county courthouses in North Carolina.  Each county in North Carolina has a city that is the county seat where the county government resides, including typically the county courthouse. This includes current and former notable courthouses. Some courthouses are listed on the National Register of Historic Places.

References

External links
 Courthouse by County from the official North Carolina Court System website

 
 
North Carolina
Courthouses, county